Kovylin is a Russian masculine surname, its feminine counterpart is Kovylina. Notable people with the surname include:

Tatiana Kovylina (born 1981), Russian model
Vladimir Kovylin (born 1954), Russian football coach and former player

Russian-language surnames